This is a list of all tornadoes that were confirmed by local offices of the National Weather Service in the United States in March 1973. By the end of the month, damage totals were up to $57,054,800 (1973 USD).

United States yearly total

March

March 1 event

March 3 event

March 6 event

March 8 event

March 9 event

March 10 event

March 11 event

March 13 event

March 15 event

March 16 event

March 17 event

March 23 event

March 24 event

March 28 event

March 29 event

March 31 event

See also
 Tornadoes of 1973
 List of United States tornadoes from January to February 1973

References

Tornadoes of 1973
March 1973 events in the United States
1973 natural disasters in the United States
1973, 03